Laurierville is a municipality in the Centre-du-Québec region of the province of Quebec in Canada.

It was constituted on November 26, 1997 by the amalgamation of the village municipality of Laurierville and the municipality of Sainte-Julie (the latter not to be confused with a different, modern-day Sainte-Julie in Montérégie).  Laurierville contains the new storage warehouse of the Federation of Quebec Maple Syrup Producers.

Notable people 

 Fernand Labrie, medical researcher
 Marie-Rose Turcot, writer

References 

Municipalities in Quebec
Incorporated places in Centre-du-Québec
Designated places in Quebec
Canada geography articles needing translation from French Wikipedia